Carl Tommy Boustedt (born 5 May 1959) is a Swedish hockey coach and sports administrator. He works as a European pro scout for the Detroit Red Wings in the NHL. He is also an advisor for the Denmark ice hockey team and a senior advisor for Hammarby IF.

Boustedt is most known for his long coaching career. He has been the head coach for Hammarby IF, Djurgårdens IF, IK Vita Hästen, Linköpings HC and Frölunda HC. He has also been an assistant coach for the Swedish national men's ice hockey team.

In 2001, Bousted joined the Swedish Ice Hockey Association as development chief. In 2014, he was promoted to Secretary-General, but left the role in 2020.

He has also been a TV analyst for Viasat, covering the Ice Hockey World Championships.

References

External links 

1959 births
Living people
Swedish ice hockey coaches
Djurgårdens IF Hockey coaches
Swedish Hockey League coaches